Maugna is a former Tongva-Gabrieleño Native American settlement, or ranchería, in Los Angeles County, California. It was located at Rancho Los Feliz (Rancho Felis), present day Hollywood.

The settlement was one of twenty seven villages included in the records of Mission San Gabriel, indicating that villagers from Maugna were baptized and labored at the mission after its establishment in the Los Angeles Basin in 1776.

References

See also
Genga
Toviscanga
Yaanga
Tongva language
California mission clash of cultures
Ranchos in California
Ranchería

History of Hollywood, Los Angeles
Former settlements in Los Angeles County, California
Former Native American populated places in California
Former populated places in California
Tongva populated places
Native Americans in Los Angeles